

Pre-unification

East Francia (843-962)

Holy Roman Empire (962-1806)

Confederation of the Rhine (1806-1813)

German Confederation (1815-1866)

North German Confederation (1867-1871)

Post-unification

German Empire (1871-1918)

Weimar Republic (1918-1933)

Nazi Germany (1933-1945)

German Democratic Republic (1949-1990)

Federal Republic of Germany (1949-present)

References

 
Wars
Wars
Germany